The Fire Next Time is a 1963 non-fiction book by James Baldwin, containing two essays: "My Dungeon Shook: Letter to my Nephew on the One Hundredth Anniversary of the Emancipation" and "Down at the Cross: Letter from a Region of My Mind".

The book's title comes from a couplet in "Mary Don't You Weep", an African-American spiritual:

The first essay, written in the form of a letter to Baldwin's 14-year-old nephew, discusses the central role of race in American history. The second essay, which takes up the majority of the book, deals with the relations between race and religion, focusing in particular on Baldwin's experiences with the Christian church as a youth, as well as the Islamic ideas of others in Harlem.

The two essays were first respectively published in American magazines in late 1962: "Letter from a Region of My Mind" in The New Yorker, and "My Dungeon Shook" in The Progressive. They were then combined and published in book form in 1963 by Dial Press, and in 1964 in Britain by Penguin Books. Critics greeted the book enthusiastically; it is considered, by some, as one of the most influential books about race relations in the 1960s. It was released in an audiobook format in 2008, narrated by Jesse L. Martin.

Content 
The book includes two essays that were written in the 1960s during a time of segregation between White and Black Americans. In his essays, Baldwin’s purpose was to reach a mass white audience and help them to better understand Black Americans' struggle for equal rights. Looking at the time period in which Baldwin’s essays were published shows how purposefully each essay was constructed. At the time, the Civil Rights Movement was beginning to recognize the need for publicity, in particular “story-telling that would generate public support for the movement’s people and goals”. This was the context into which Baldwin’s essays were first published.

What made Baldwin’s essays effective is that they were testimonial. Giving testimonial evidence about how racism in America has operated in real people’s lives is an effective strategy for connecting with an audience that is otherwise clueless. The book met both the needs of the Civil Rights Movement for publicity, but also an unspoken need of white audiences who did not understand the movement or the lives of the people involved. Although many of the ideas that Baldwin writes about in his essays were not new to black intellectualism, the way they were presented to their audience was. Baldwin’s writings profoundly “provoked and challenged the dominant white American frame for understanding race relations” during the time that they were first published.

"My Dungeon Shook"

The first essay, originally appearing in The Progressive magazine in 1962 and titled "My Dungeon Shook: Letter to My Nephew on the One Hundredth Anniversary of the Emancipation", is a letter to Baldwin’s nephew in which he compares his nephew to the men in their family including Baldwin’s brother and father. He tells his nephew about America’s ability to destroy Black men and challenges his nephew to convert his anger due to mistreatment as a Black man into having a passionate and broad outlook on the African-American experience.

"Down at the Cross: Letter from a Region in my Mind"
The second essay originally appeared in The New Yorker (1962) under the title "Letter from a Region in My Mind".

Titled in the book as "Down at the Cross: Letter from a Region in my Mind", the essay addresses the detriment of Christianity on the Black community and Baldwin’s journey from being a teen pastor to completely pulling away from the church because it felt like a repression of his full experience of humanity. He then recounts his dinner with Elijah Muhammad where Muhammad educated Baldwin on the Nation of Islam in the hope of getting him to join the movement. In this section Baldwin describes how Black Muslims have made a "black god" to avoid the oppression of a "white god" that Christianity has established within the Black community.

Responses 
Jacquelyn Dowd Hall wrote an article that focused on the civil rights movement, led by Martin Luther King Jr., building on Baldwin's work. Baldwin's piece examined the issue of racism mainly in his area of Harlem, New York, and Hall emphasized that the racial issue they confronted in America was not a sectional but a national problem.

Another article that expands on Baldwin's new religious view was written by Jon Nilson, a theology professor. In The Fire Next Time, Baldwin focused on how Christianity was corrupted. Observing that Baldwin challenged the Catholic Church, Nilson said that the April 1968 assassination of Martin Luther King Jr. had almost seemed like The Fire Next Time had come true.

In December 2016, Can I Get a Witness? The Gospel of James Baldwin, a 2016 musical theatrical tribute to Baldwin by the musician Meshell Ndegeocello and based on The Fire Next Time was premiered at the Harlem Stage in Harlem.

In July 2015, Ta-Nehisi Coates wrote an article in The Atlantic as a modernized version of Baldwin's letter to his nephew called "Letter to My Son", and later published an entire book called Between the World and Me that talks about the current state of the Black experience in America.

The title was alluded to in Max Hastings' book America, 1968: The Fire This Time.

See also 
 James Baldwin: A Soul on Fire
 The New Jim Crow
 Between the World and Me
 Timeline of the civil rights movement

References

External links

1963 non-fiction books
Dial Press books
Essay collections by James Baldwin
Non-fiction books about racism
Works originally published in The New Yorker